Dever Akeem Orgill (born 8 March 1990) is a Jamaican footballer who plays as a forward for Bodrumspor.

Club career

Youth and amateur
Born in Port Antonio, Orgill attended Titchfield High School where he was coached by Andrew Edwards, and played club soccer for Progressive FC before joining the youth academy of Canadian team Vancouver Whitecaps in August 2007. He scored goals against the youth academies of Eintracht Frankfurt and Leicester City at the XXIX Dallas Cup, and played in the USL Premier Development League with the Vancouver Whitecaps Residency team in 2008.

Professional
Orgill was called up from the Vancouver Whitecaps Residency to Vancouver Whitecaps on 15 August 2008 After a promising start in 2009, Orgill suffered a knee injury in August, ruling him out for the rest of the 2009 season. In July 2010 he was released by the Whitecaps due to disciplinary infractions.

In August 2010, Orgill returned to Jamaica and signed with St. George's SC in his home parish. He returned to Canada in the autumn of 2012 and signed in late April for Vancouver Metro Soccer League side North Vancouver Federazione Calcio Campobasso. In his first season, he was the club's top scorer.

In April 2013 following a few days of trials, Orgill signed with IFK Mariehamn in Finland.

In November 2016, Orgill signed a contract with Wolfsberger AC in Austria.

On 31 January 2019, Dever Origil joined Süper Lig side Ankaragücü on a 1,5 year deal. He made his debut for Ankaragücü against Trabzonspor on 2 February 2019. He scored his first goal in a 3–0 home win against Kasımpaşa on 11 February. He was released by the club at the end of the season.

Orgill joined fellow Turkish club Antalyaspor in August 2020.

In 2021, Orgill transferred to Manisa. 

In December 2022 Orgill joined Bodrumspor.

International career
In 2005, he won the Golden Boot award in the Caribbean Football Union’s U15 tournament held in Trinidad and Tobago after scoring 12 goals in six matches.  Orgill was the captain of the Jamaica squad during the CONCACAF U-17 World Cup qualifiers 2007, and has played in more than 10 games for the Jamaica U-20 team. Orgill made his senior national debut versus Trinidad in Kingston, Jamaica on 10 October 2010. Orgill scored his first and second international goals for Jamaica on June 17, 2019.

Career statistics

Club
As of match played 12 February 2019

International
As of match played 29 December 2020

International goals
Scores and results list Jamaica's goal tally first.

Honors
Vancouver Whitecaps
USL First Division: 2008

IFK Mariehamn
Finnish Cup: 2015
Veikkausliiga: 2016

References

External links
 Vancouver Whitecaps bio 
 News story about his release from the Whitecaps 
 

1990 births
People from Port Antonio
Living people
Jamaican footballers
Jamaica youth international footballers
Jamaica under-20 international footballers
Jamaica international footballers
Association football forwards
Vancouver Whitecaps Residency players
Vancouver Whitecaps (1986–2010) players
IFK Mariehamn players
Wolfsberger AC players
MKE Ankaragücü footballers
Antalyaspor footballers
Manisa FK footballers
USL League Two players
USL First Division players
USSF Division 2 Professional League players
National Premier League players
Veikkausliiga players
Austrian Football Bundesliga players
Süper Lig players
TFF First League players
2009 CONCACAF U-20 Championship players
Copa América Centenario players
2019 CONCACAF Gold Cup players
Jamaican expatriate footballers
Jamaican expatriate sportspeople in Canada
Expatriate soccer players in Canada
Jamaican expatriate sportspeople in Finland
Expatriate footballers in Finland
Jamaican expatriate sportspeople in Austria
Expatriate footballers in Austria
Jamaican expatriate sportspeople in Turkey
Expatriate footballers in Turkey